Ovinjange is a village in the Epupa Constituency of Namibia north-eastern Kunene Region.

Kunene governor Angelika Muharukua has her homestead in Ovinjange.

References 

Populated places in the Kunene Region